Dabaqabad, or Daba Qabad is a village in Burao District, in the Togdheer Region of Somaliland. It is located north by road from Balidhiig.

See also
Administrative divisions of Somaliland
Regions of Somaliland
Districts of Somaliland
Somalia–Somaliland border

References

Populated places in Togdheer